The Montage Reno is a high-rise residential building in Reno, Nevada. It previously operated as a hotel and casino from 1978 to 2005, under various names, including Sahara Reno, Reno Hilton, Flamingo Hilton Reno, Flamingo Reno, and Golden Phoenix Reno.

The building was converted into a condominium tower from 2006 to 2008. It was formerly connected to Fitzgeralds Reno by a sky bridge. It is owned and operated by ST Residential LLC.

History

Sahara Reno (1978–81)

The main hotel/casino, on North Sierra Street, was originally opened in 1978 as Sahara Reno. It was owned by the Del E. Webb Corporation, which also owned the Sahara resort in Las Vegas. The Sahara Reno was designed by David Jacobson Associates and constructed by the Del E. Webb Corporation.

A separate casino building, located on Virginia Street, had previously operated from 1955 until 1978 as the Primadonna, before becoming part of the Sahara. The Virginia Street building was later reopened as Siri's Casino in 2014.

Hilton/Flamingo (1981–2001)

In 1981, the Sahara Reno became the Reno Hilton, then was renovated in 1992 and became the Flamingo Hilton Reno.

In 2000, Hilton declined to renew its licensing agreement with the Flamingo brand, and the Flamingo Hilton Reno became simply the Flamingo Reno, returning to the original brand formed in the 1940s in Las Vegas.

The 602 room hotel-casino made a profit until its corporate owner Park Place Entertainment, owned by a subsidiary of Hilton Hotels, decided the resort was no longer profitable in a declining gaming market. They decided to close the property on October 21, 2001. The property was sold soon after closing to Vista Hospitality LLC of New York who pledged to renovate and reopen the hotel-casino.

Golden Phoenix Reno (2002–05)

The new name—Golden Phoenix Reno—was announced in early 2002. The property's hotel reopened on April 2, 2002. It included 604 rooms, a Benihana steakhouse, a coffee shop, and a nightclub. The property's casino area opened in summer 2003, with an official grand opening. Prior to the casino's grand opening, the movie The Cooler was filmed at the Golden Phoenix.

Chicago real estate developer Fernando Leal put a bid in to buy the hotel-casino. Leal won his bid, and announced plans to convert the hotel-casino property into "The Montage" following a $170 million investment that would take the hotel property down to its concrete support columns, and rebuild condominiums based on the original platform.

Leal closed the Golden Phoenix on December 6, 2005, and his crews began gutting the hotel building in spring 2006.

The Montage Reno (2008–present)

The Montage Reno was completed in April 2008. Originally, Leal envisioned The Montage Reno as a flourishing condominium resort with a signed lease for Ruth's Chris Steakhouse and the other retail pad planned for the high-profile Cafe Med. Both would fall out. And as a result, Leal would hand the completed project back to its lender to avert a foreclosure disaster in December 2008.

The Montage is now owned by Chicago-based ST Residential, a subsidiary of Starwood Assets and Holdings, a global company. The property is still marketed as a condominium resort with Reno's most exclusive condo amenities such as a 24-hour doorman, resort style pool deck, owners lounge and top grade finishes.

See also

References

External links

1978 establishments in Nevada
Casino hotels
Casinos in Reno, Nevada
Defunct casinos in Nevada
Defunct hotels in Nevada
Hotel buildings completed in 1978
Hotels established in 1978
Hotels disestablished in 2005
Residential skyscrapers in Nevada